Attorney General Mann may refer to:

Charles Mann (Australian politician) (1838–1889), Attorney-General of South Australia
Gerald Mann (1907–1990), Attorney General of Texas